The IABSA Premier 64-01 was a Brazilian two-seat training and touring braced high-wing monoplane designed and built in small numbers by Industria Aeronáutica Brasileira (IABSA),  powered by a  piston engine.

Specifications

References

Notes

Bibliography

1960s Brazilian civil utility aircraft
Aircraft first flown in 1964
Premier 64-01